Parliamentary elections were held in Ukraine on 27 March 1994, with a second round between 2 and 10 April. 15 political parties gained seats and the majority of deputies were independents. However, 112 seats were remained unfilled, and a succession of by-elections were required in July, August, November and December 1994 and more in December 1995 and April 1996. Three hundred (300) seats or two thirds (2/3) of the parliament were required to be filled for the next convocation.

In what were the first elections held after Ukraine broke away from the Soviet Union, the Communist Party of Ukraine emerged as the largest party in the Verkhovna Rada, winning 86 of the 338 seats decided in the first two rounds. This election was the result of a compromise between the President and the Verkhovna Rada, which was reached on 24 September 1993 because of a political crisis caused by mass protests and strikes particularly from students and miners. On that day, the Rada adopted a decree to organize parliamentary elections ahead of schedule, and ahead of scheduled presidential elections in June.

Electoral system (50% rule)
As in the previous this election took place according to the majoritarian electoral system in 450 electoral districts containing several precincts. Each region was assigned a proportion of districts depending on its population. Hence the most mandates were received by the more populated eastern regions of Ukraine, particularly the regions of Donets basin such as Donetsk Oblast and Dnipropetrovsk Oblast.

In order to be elected a candidate needed to obtain more than 50% of votes and in order for the election to be valid more than 50% of registered voters needed to vote. If no candidate obtained more than 50% in the first round, the top two candidates were listed on the ballot in the second round. In the second round the 50% rule was applied as well. Reelections were called if the 50% votes in the second round was not met.

Because of those conditions several districts in the Verkhovna Rada were left not represented for a whole convocation. Particularly acute that problem was in the city of Kyiv that was assigned 23 mandates, while in the parliament only 10 representatives for Kyiv participated in the second convocation - less than a half. Kyiv became the most under represented region.

Results

Parliamentary factions
Blocs were formed in the Rada on 11 May 1994:

The political blocks formed in the Verkhovna Rada did not exactly represented a similar party. Such parties as the Peasant's Party of Ukraine (SelPU) and the Agrarians for Reform (AZR) (a breakaway SelPU members) formed the Agrarians of Ukraine block. Although some of the deputies, especially from SelPU, joined the Socialist block. The Ukrainian Republican Party (URP), the Congress of Ukrainian Nationalists (CUN), and the Democratic Party of Ukraine (DemPU) has formed the electoral block Derzhavnist (Statehood).

 The left electoral blocks: Communists of Ukraine, Socialist block, and Peasant's Party of Ukraine
 The right electoral blocks: People's Movement of Ukraine and Derzhavnist
 The center electoral blocks: Interregional block, Social-Market Choice, Unity, and Agrarians for Reforms
 The right-center electoral blocks: Reforms and Center

In February 1997 the following factions were present in parliament:
 The leftist: Communist of Ukraine (86 seats), Socialist Party of Ukraine (25 seats) and Peasant's Party of Ukraine (38 seats)
 The centrist: Constitutional Center (56 seats), Unity (37 seats), Intraregional Deputies Group (28 seats), Social-Market Choice (25 seats) and Independents (25 seats)
The national democratic: Reforms and (29 seats) People's Movement of Ukraine (27 seats).

By regions (single constituency)

Regional rankings

by party
Crimea (19)
 No party affiliation (11)
 Communist Party of Ukraine (7)
 Party of Economic Revival of Crimea (1)

Vinnytsia Region (16)
 No party affiliation (15)
 Communist Party of Ukraine (1)

Volyn Region (9)
 No party affiliation (7)
 Ukrainian Republican Party (1)
 Democratic Party of Ukraine (1)

Dnipropetrovsk Region (34)
 No party affiliation (25)
 Labor Party (3)
 Peasant Party of Ukraine (3)
 Communist Party of Ukraine (1)
 Socialist Party of Ukraine (1)
 Party of Democratic Revival of Ukraine (1)

Donetsk Region (48)
 Communist Party of Ukraine (24)
 No party affiliation (18)
 Socialist Party of Ukraine (3)
 Peasant Party of Ukraine (1)
 Labor Party (1)
 Democratic Party of Ukraine (1)

Zhytomyr Region (12)
 No party affiliation (8)
 Communist Party of Ukraine (3)
 Peasant Party of Ukraine (1)

Zakarpattia Region (11)
 No party affiliation (9)
 Social-Democratic Party of Ukraine (1)
 Christian Democratic Party of Ukraine (1)

Zaporizhzhia Region (18)
 No party affiliation (8)
 Communist Party of Ukraine (7)
 Party of Democratic Revival of Ukraine (1)
 Socialist Party of Ukraine (1)
 Peasant Party of Ukraine (1)

Ivano-Frankivsk Region (13)
 No party affiliation (10)
 Congress of Ukrainian Nationalists (2)
 Ukrainian Republican Party (1)

Kirovohrad Region (12)
 No party affiliation (6)
 Communist Party of Ukraine (4)
 People's Movement of Ukraine (1)
 Democratic Party of Ukraine (1)

Luhansk Region (23)
 Communist Party of Ukraine (14)
 No party affiliation (8)
 Socialist Party of Ukraine (1)

Lviv Region (22)
 No party affiliation (10)
 People's Movement of Ukraine (5)
 Congress of Ukrainian Nationalists (3)
 Party of Democratic Revival of Ukraine (2)
 Ukrainian Republican Party (1)
 Ukrainian Conservative Republican Party (1)

Mykolaiv Region (11)
 No party affiliation (5)
 Communist Party of Ukraine (5)
 Peasant Party of Ukraine (1)

Odesa Region (23)
 No party affiliation (14)
 Communist Party of Ukraine (6)
 Peasant Party of Ukraine (2)
 Socialist Party of Ukraine (1)

Kyiv Region (17)
 No party affiliation (11)
 People's Movement of Ukraine (3)
 Socialist Party of Ukraine (1)
 Peasant Party of Ukraine (1)
 Ukrainian Republican Party (1)

Poltava Region (16)
 No party affiliation (13)
 Communist Party of Ukraine (2)
 Peasant Party of Ukraine (1)

Rivne Region (10)
 No party affiliation (4)
 People's Movement of Ukraine (4)
 Ukrainian Republican Party (2)

Sumy Region (12)
 Communist Party of Ukraine (4)
 Socialist Party of Ukraine (3)
 No party affiliation (3)
 People's Movement of Ukraine (1)
 Peasant Party of Ukraine (1)

Ternopil Region (10)
 Ukrainian Republican Party (3)
 People's Movement of Ukraine (2)
 No party affiliation (2)
 Congress of Ukrainian Nationalists (1)
 Ukrainian National Assembly (1)
 Ukrainian Conservative Republican Party (1)

Kharkiv Region (25)
 No party affiliation (16)
 Communist Party of Ukraine (6)
 Socialist Party of Ukraine (2)
 Peasant Party of Ukraine (1)

Kherson Region (10)
 Communist Party of Ukraine (5)
 No party affiliation (3)
 Socialist Party of Ukraine (1)
 Peasant Party of Ukraine (1)

Khmelnytsky Region (13)
 No party affiliation (8)
 Socialist Party of Ukraine (2)
 Ukrainian Republican Party (1)
 Communist Party of Ukraine (1)
 Peasant Party of Ukraine (1)

Cherkasy Region (13)
 No party affiliation (8)
 Peasant Party of Ukraine (3)
 Communist Party of Ukraine (2)

Chernivtsi Region (8)
 No party affiliation (5)
 People's Movement of Ukraine (1)
 Socialist Party of Ukraine (1)
 Peasant Party of Ukraine (1)

Chernihiv Region (13)
 No party affiliation (8)
 Communist Party of Ukraine (3)
 Labor Party (1)
 Peasant Party of Ukraine (1)

Kyiv (11/23)
 No party affiliation (6)
 People's Movement of Ukraine (4)
 Ukrainian Republican Party (1)

Sevastopol (4)
 Communist Party of Ukraine (3)
 No party affiliation (1)

by nationality
Kyiv (11/23)
 Ukrainian (9)
 Russian (1)
 Bulgarian (1)

Sevastopol (4)
 Russian (2)
 Ukrainian (1)
 Not identified (1)

Crimea (19)
 Russian (9)
 Ukrainian (6)
 Jewish (2)
 Karaite (1)
 Not identified (1)

Vinnytsia Region (16/17)
 Ukrainian (14)
 Russian (1)
 Polish (1)

Volyn Region (8/9)
 Ukrainian (8)

Dnipropetrovsk Region (34)
 Ukrainian (28)
 Russian (4)
 Not identified (2)

Donetsk Region (47)
 Ukrainian (27→26)
 Russian (18→19)
 Adyghe (1)
 Jewish (1)

Zhytomyr Region (12/13)
 Ukrainian (10)
 Russian (1)
 German (1)

Zakarpattia Region (10)
 Ukrainian (8)
 Russian (1)
 Hungarian (1)

Zaporizhzhia Region (18)
 Ukrainian (12)
 Russian (6)

Ivano-Frankivsk Region (12/13)
 Ukrainian (10)
 Russian (1)
 Not identified (1)

Kyiv Region (16)
 Ukrainian (14)
 Russian (2)

Kirovohrad Region (10)
 Ukrainian (7→6)
 Russian (3)
 Not identified (0→1)

Luhansk Region (24)
 Ukrainian (12)
 Russian (10)
 Chuvash (1)
 Jewish (1)

Lviv Region (22/23)
 Ukrainian (22)

Mykolaiv Region (11)
 Ukrainian (7)
 Russian (4)

Odesa Region (21/23)
 Ukrainian (12→13)
 Russian (6→5)
 Jewish (1)
 Moldavian (1)
 Bulgarian (1)
 Not identified (1)

Poltava Region (16)
 Ukrainian (14)
 Russian (1)
 Belorussian (1)

Rivne Region (10)
 Ukrainian (9)
 Not identified (1)

 Sumy Region (11/13)
 Ukrainian (11)

Ternopil Regin (10)
 Ukrainian (10)

Kharkiv Region (25/28)
 Ukrainian (14)
 Russian (8)
 Jewish (1)
 Polish (1)
 Not identified (1)

Kherson Region (9/11)
 Ukrainian (7)
 Belorussian (1)
 Not identified (1)

Khmelnytskyi Region (13)
 Ukrainian (12)
 Russian (1)

Cherkasy Region (13)
 Ukrainian (13)

Chernivtsi Region (8)
 Ukrainian (7)
 Romanian (1)

Chernihiv Region (12)
 Ukrainian (10)
 Russian (2)

Aftermath
Due to the low turnout, 112 seats remained vacant and later in the summer of 1994 (24 and 31 July and 7 August) 20 MPs were elected to the Rada. On 20 November and 4 December nine more MPs were elected.

On 30 May 1994 MP Roman Kuper died of a heart attack and Leonid Kravchuk was elected as his replacement on 25 September. On 15 July Leonid Kuchma surrendered his parliamentarian mandate after being elected President, and Vasyl Yevrukhov was elected in his place.

References

External links
Parliamentary and Presidential Elections of 1994 Analitik 
Elections in Ukraine Kandydat 
Elections in contemporary Ukraine Tomenko 
List of deputies

Parliamentary elections in Ukraine
Ukraine
Parliamentary election
Ukraine
2nd Ukrainian Verkhovna Rada